Johnny Gaddaar is a 2007 Indian Hindi-language neo-noir thriller film written and directed by Sriram Raghavan, produced under the banner Adlabs. It stars Neil Nitin Mukesh, in his film debut, alongside Dharmendra, Biswajit Chatterjee, Zakir Hussain, Rimi Sen, Vinay Pathak, Govind Namdeo, Dayanand Shetty and Ashwini Kalsekar. The film received critical acclaim  and was a sleeper hit at the box-office.

The film was later remade in Malayalam as Unnam, in Telugu as Kamina and in Tamil as Johnny. The movie is an adaptation of the 1963 French movie Symphonie Pour Un Massacre (The Corrupt) by Jacques Deray which was based on the 1962 French crime novel Les Mystifies by Alain Reynaud Fourton.

Plot
The film starts out on a rainy night with a conversation between four cops in a police van, patrolling the streets of Mumbai. A car narrowly misses, colliding into them on the road, brakes and then continues on towards a house with iron gates. A man in a jacket gets out from the car, heads towards the garage, and opens the roller shutter door when he is shot from behind multiple times. At the same time, the cops in the van receive an alert on the radio that gunshots have been heard somewhere in the vicinity and they ask the driver to head towards the location of the gunshots.

The entire movie is then shown as a flashback, building up to the present shooting, and scene of the cops in the van.

The story is about a gang of five that run a gambling club and conduct other underhand deals. The five members are Vikram, Seshadri, Shardul, Prakash, and Shiva. When one of Seshadri's police contacts from Bengaluru, Kalyan informs him, on the phone about "French furniture" (code word for drugs) worth Rs. 5 crore that he can offer him for Rs. 2.5 crore, Seshadri calls for all five members to contribute Rs. 50 lacs each to set the deal in motion.  Based on Shardul's promise of being able to sell the furniture for more than Rs. 5 crore, each member anticipates a profit of a further Rs. 50 lacs each, at least.

They agree that Shiva is to take the money to Bengaluru by train, meet Kalyan, make the exchange and return on the same train. Vikram, who is dating Shardul's wife Mini and desperately wants to emigrate to Canada with her, plans to steal the money from Shiva in the train by using chloroform to make him unconscious. In the pretext of going to Goa for business work, he goes about his plot, driving to Pune (where he uses the name Johnny G to check into hotel) then takes a flight to Goa. In Goa, he meets advocate Gomes who is Seshadri's friend, to get his work done and to serve as an alibi later, if required. He makes sure the work is half done, flies back to Mumbai and checks-in to a hotel before boarding the train that Shiva takes, the train to Bengaluru enroute Pune. But plans go wrong, and Vikram ends up killing Shiva, who unmasks him before going unconscious. Now Sheshadri, Kalyan, Prakash, and Shardul one-by-one, find out Vikram's truth and are killed by him in cold blood. Finally, Vikram is killed by Prakash's wife Varsha, who mistakes him for Shardul, who she believed was Prakash's killer.

Tribute and reference

In the opening credits the movie is dedicated to legendary Indian Cinema director Vijay Anand and writer James Hadley Chase. The film is a tribute to Vijay Anand's influence on the Hindi noir/thriller genre. It pays tribute to him in a scene in which Anand's movie Johny Mera Naam is being watched by a character. At the lobby of a hotel room, the receptionist is seen watching Vijay Anand's movie Johnny Mera Naam, starring Dev Anand. It is from the scene of that movie that this one gets its title. When the female lead is introduced she is reading R.K. Narayan's The Guide, which was later made into a movie directed by Vijay Anand, starring Dev Anand.

While the story is not based on any of James Hadley Chase's novels, it does follow a similar plot line. There are numerous references to James Hadley Chase within the film, the lead character himself is seen holding a copy of one of Chase's books. Director Sriram Raghavan has presented the same genre in his previous venture Ek Hasina Thi as well.

The film also makes multiple references to Amitabh Bachchan classic Parwaana and also shows scenes of a major plot sequence of the movie.

There are multiple tributes to the actor Dharmendra himself. While dying, Dharmendra plays the song "Mera Gora Rang Le Le" – his character's favourite song sung by the character's wife (Sonia Rakkar) in the movie, which is from his movie Bandini in which played in the movie. They are from Yakeen, Aadmi Aur Insaan and Naya Zamana.

There are a couple of references to Hollywood movies too, for example when Shiva is introduced in the movie, he's watching Stanley Kubrick's last film, Eyes Wide Shut. And Dharmendra's line "It's not the age. It's the mileage" echoes a line from the Indiana Jones movie Raiders of the Lost Ark. Apart from the note-counting scene obviously inspired from Scarface, there is a reference to Titanic as well as Citizen Kane in the scene where the female lead is assembling a huge jigsaw puzzle.

The colour Red is used predominantly in the movie, as a homage to Sin City. Raghavan himself had confessed wanting to shoot the whole film in Black and White.

But the main game is that Raghavan's inspiration for the plot and characterization was not Vijay Anand's film Johny Mera Naam. Raghavan employs a rope-a-dope by implying that his movie as a tribute to Vijay Anand and also adding in Parwaana and James Hadley Chase as distraction, while the fact is that the movie was an adaptation of the 1963 French movie Symphonie Pour Un Massacre (The Corrupt) by Jacques Deray which was based on the 1962 French crime novel Les Mystifies by Alain Reynaud Fourton though there are also similarities with the Stanley Kubrick's film noir classic The Killing - in the plot elements like the ex-conman character, the cheating wife and no-one escape climax - which are not coincidental. The only stark difference is that Kubrick's Johnny isn't the gaddar (the traitor).

Cast

 Neil Nitin Mukesh as Vikram / Johnny G
 Dharmendra as Sheshadri 'Seshu'
 Rimi Sen as Mini (Vikram's Girlfriend and Shardul's Wife)
 Zakir Hussain as Shardul
 Vinay Pathak as Prakash 'Pakiya'
 Ashwini Kalsekar as Varsha (Prakash's wife)
 Dayanand Shetty as Shiva
 Govind Namdeo as Inspector Kalyan
 Vyjayanthi as Nurse Vaijanti
 Rasika Joshi as Shiva's mother
 Shankar Sachdev as Naidu

Soundtrack

The film has fifteen songs and two remixes composed by Shankar–Ehsaan–Loy (soundtrack) and Daniel B George (score), with lyrics by Jaideep Sahni. The album was met with high critical acclaim upon its release. The soundtrack was co produced by composers Shankar–Ehsaan–Loy and Adlabs, which is first of its kind in the history of Bollywood. The album was released on 13 September 2007 at IMAX, Wadala, Mumbai. Shankar–Ehsaan–Loy, Dharmendra, Neil Nitin Mukesh and Sriram Raghavan were present at the launch among others.

Director Sriram Raghavan approached S-E-L to score a single for the film. As they were discussing, Ehsaan came up with a riff which Sriram felt fits the theme of the movie, which then turned out to be the title song "Johnny Gaddaar". Then they decided to go for another song, which was to be picturised in a club setting. Sriram wanted it to have an early '70s feel, along the lines of the famous R.D. Burman song, "Duniya Main". Hence they jammed and came up with the second track, the rich and vibrant "Dhoka". Sriram had seen rapper Hard Kaur on TV and was impressed with her. So he asked her and the trio to jam together, and they came up with the final song of the album, "Move Your Body". The album includes Tamil and Telugu versions of the tracks "Johnny Gaddaar" and "Move Your Body".

Reception

The album was met with high praise from critics upon release. Raja Sen of Rediff, who awarded the soundtrack four and a half stars was ecstatic about the soundtrack, "Johnny Gaddaar is a delightfully harebrained work showing off extreme musical maturity. This is the soundtrack that breaks all the rules, the three buddies reveling in the recklessness director Sriram Raghavan gives them. This is what Modesty Blaise would dance to, an album of lunatic retro genius.". Joginder Tuteja of Bollywood Hungama gave the album a three-and-a-half stars, stating, "In 'Johnny Gaddaar', don't even expect the kind of soundtrack that you hear in a conventional Bollywood film. Instead expect to get on a rhythmic ride which would hardly give you a breather throughout its 11 tracks. The music of 'Johnny Gaddaar' isn't anything that you have heard before in a mainstream Hindi film before. And this is where its strength lies!". Atta Khan of Planet Bollywood in his 9 star review, praised the soundtrack "Every once in a while a soundtrack comes along that leaves you in awe at its sheer audacity and pizzazz. Not to mention style, inspiration, variety, innovation and all round brilliance! In this reviewer's opinion, Johnny Gaddaar is such a soundtrack. The whole package here including the instrumentals is an integral USP of the movie giving it a (dark but hip) character that many soundtracks only dream of achieving. Yet at the same time it is a great stand alone audio product too. Its unconventional approach challenges every listener to expand their listening horizon and it's an offer everyone should wholeheartedly accept."

The soundtrack featured in the "Top 10 music Albums of the year" list by Rediff, which said Shankar, Ehsaan and Loy get it right again with twisted, unorthodox productions like Johnny Gaddaar. It also was featured in the "Top 15 albums of the year" list of Planetbollywood, who remarked that "SEL have succeed in re-defining themselves and maintaining the edge over their counterparts."

Awards and nominations

Filmfare Awards
Winner
 2008: Filmfare Award for Best Sound Design; Leslie Fernandes

Star Screen Awards
Nominated
 2008: Star Screen Award for Most Promising Newcomer - Male; Neil Nitin Mukesh

Stardust Awards
Nominated
 2008: Stardust Superstar of Tomorrow - Male; Neil Nitin Mukesh
 2008: Stardust Award for New Musical Sensation – Female – Hard Kaur for the song "Move Your Body"
 2008: Stardust Award for New Musical Sensation – Female – Akriti Kakkar for the song "Johnny Gadaar"

IIFA Awards
Winner
 2008: Fresh Face of the Year; Neil Nitin Mukesh

Star Guild Awards
Winner
 2008: Best Actor in a Negative Role; Neil Nitin Mukesh

Zee Cine Awards
Winner
 2008: Special Award; Neil Nitin Mukesh

Apsara Film and Television Producers Guild Awards
Winner
 2008: Best Performance in a negative role; Neil Nitin Mukesh

References

External links
 
 Interview with Srirama Raghavan

2007 films
Hindi films remade in other languages
2000s Hindi-language films
Indian neo-noir films
Indian crime thriller films
2007 crime thriller films
2000s heist films
Films about organised crime in India
Indian heist films
Films directed by Sriram Raghavan